Rupinderpal Singh Dhillon or Roop Dhillon (Punjabi: ਰੂਪਿੰਦਰਪਾਲ ਸਿੰਘ ਢਿੱਲੋਂ, born 1969) is a British Punjabi writer of fiction and poetry.

Early life and education
Dhillon was born in West London and initially raised in Southall. He studied at Oxford Brookes University and De Montfort University and is an accountant. He has been living in Reigate since the mid 2000s.

Writing career
Originally intending to write an English novel based on the life of Maharaja Ranjit Singh in the mode of Alexandre Dumas, Dhillon became interested in writing in Punjabi after learning the Gurmukhi alphabet in his thirties. His debut novel, Neela Noor, was published in 2007. He writes in the locally spoken form of the language whose syntax is influenced by English; sometimes called 'Punglish', it had not previously been written down. His work is mainly influenced by Western literature and confronts social issues including racism, gender bias and incest. Bharind (The Hornet) is a collection of short stories and poetry. In his later novels such as the experimental gothic novel O, he employs a genre he calls Vachitarvaad, which encompasses science fiction, fantasy, horror and magical realism.

Dhillon is a member of the Punjabi Writers Sahit Kendar in Southall and Baagi Batti, a British Asian group of writers who choose to write in their heritage language. He has been working on Chita Te Kala ( The White and The Black) for the last few years which has now been published. His Science fiction novel Sindhbaad ( ਸਿੰਧਬਾਦ) was released in 2020 and uses the lens of science fiction to examine the complexities of Punjabi society's attitude towards women, caste and religion using alien species to represent the religious groups that make up Punjabis. As a result Roop was awarded the Shivcharan Singh Gill Trust Award 2020 (ਸ਼ਿਵਚਰਨ ਸਿੰਘ ਗਿੱਲ ਟਰੱਸਟ ਸਾਊਥਾਲ 2020) for his contributions to Punjabi Literature. He has written a novel, Nagaan Dee Khed, set in the world of espionage with Covid and the Andolan ( Farmer's Protest in 2020/2021 in Delhi) as the background. He is currently working on a horror novel , Haul  ਹੌਲ਼) and a collection of Magical Realism short stories ( ਖ਼ਤ).

Works
 Nila Noor, The Blue Light, 2007,
 Beghar Baagh, The Homeless Leopard, 2009
 Kaldaar, The Robot, 2010
 Barcelona: Ghar Vaapasi, 2010
 Bharind - The Hornet, 2011, Lahore Publishers, Ludhiana
 O, 2015, Lokgreet Parkashan, Chandigarh
 Gunda - The Gangster, 2014, Khushjeevan Kitabaan, London
 Samurai, 2018, Gracious Books, Patiala
Sindbad', 2020, Khushjeevan Kitabaan, LondonChita Te Kala', 2022, Avis Publications, Delhi

References 

1969 births
Living people
Punjabi-language writers
People from Southall